Okell is a surname. Notable people with this surname include:

 Frank Okell (1887-1950), English bishop
 Janet Okell (1922–2005), English wargamer
 John Okell (1934–2020), British linguist
 Marjorie Okell (1908–2009), British athlete
 William Okell, founder of Okells Brewery